Uranium poisoning in Punjab first made news in March 2009, when a South African Board Certified Candidate Clinical Metal Toxicologist, Carin Smit, visiting Faridkot city in Punjab, India, instrumental in having hair and urine samples taken (2008/09) of 149/53 children respectively, who were affected with birth abnormalities including physical deformities, neurological and mental disorders. These samples were shipped to Microtrace Mineral Lab, Germany.

At the onset of the action research project, it was expected that heavy metal toxicity might be implicated as reasons why these children were so badly affected.  Surprisingly, high levels of uranium were found in 88% of the samples, and in the case of one child, the levels were more than 60 times the maximum safe limit.

A study, carried out amongst mentally disabled children in the Malwa region of Punjab, revealed 87% of children below 12 years and 82% beyond that age having uranium levels high enough to cause diseases, also uranium levels in samples of three kids from Kotkapura and Faridkot were 62, 44 and 27 times higher than normal.

Subsequently, the Baba Farid Centre for Special Children, Faridkot, sent samples of five children from the worst-affected village, Teja Rohela, near Fazilka, which has over 100 children which are congenitally mentally and physically challenged, to the same lab.

Since 2009, Micro Trace Minerals of Germany has continued testing cancer patients, living in the Malwa Region of Punjab, the area known for having the highest cancer rate in India. Patient evaluation and the collection of nail samples was carried out with the help of Prof. Chander Parkash of the Technical University of Punjab. As with previous studies, high uranium was found in nearly all test persons. The work was published in the British Journal of Medicine and Medical Research in 2015.

History

As early as 1995, Guru Nanak Dev University (GNDU) released a report showing the presence of uranium and other heavy metals beyond permissible limits in water samples collected from Bathinda and Amritsar district, however there was no response from the government at that time. The hotspot for this increased toxicity, however was the Malwa region of Punjab, which showed extremely high levels of chemical, biological and radioactive toxicity, including uranium contamination. As the region's groundwater and food chain was gradually contaminated by industrial effluents flowing into fresh water sources used both for irrigation and drinking purposes, the region showed a rise in neurological diseases, and a sharp increase in cancer cases and kidney ailments, for example in Muktsar district between 2001 and 2009, 1,074 people died of cancer.

Over the years, a case of slow poisoning was suspected by health workers of the Baba Farid Center For Special Children (BFCSC) in Bathinda and Faridkot, when they saw a sharp increase in the number of severely handicapped children, birth defects like hydrocephaly, microcephaly, cerebral palsy, Down's syndrome and other physical and mental abnormalities, and cancers in children.

In March 2008, Dr. Carin Smit, a candidate clinical metal toxicologist in private practice in South Africa, and Vera Dirr, a teacher of children with cerebral palsy, were alarmed after seeing high incidences of abnormalities in local children at the Baba Farid Center For Special Children (BFCSC) in Faridkot, a not-for-profit organization working with kids, ailing from autism, cerebral palsy and other neurological disorders requested help for laboratory tests from Microtarce Mineral Lab, Germany. The centre reported a rise in the number of cases in the last six to seven years. The BFCSC uses naturopathic principles to treat is patients.

Subsequent tests, carried out on the ground water displayed levels of uranium as high as 224 micrograms per litre (µg/L).  However, samples taken in the vicinity of the around the coal-fired power plants were up to 15 times above the World Health Organization's maximum safe limits.  It was found that the contamination included a large parts of the state of Punjab, home to 24 million people. In 2010, water samples taken from Buddha Nullah, a highly polluted water canal, which merges into the Sutlej River, showed heavy metal content as quite high and the presence of uranium 1½ times the reference range., and together with other forms of pollution, like ammonia, phosphate, chloride, chromium, arsenic and chlorpyrifos pesticides, the rivulet, is now being termed as "Other Bhopal" in the making.

Causes

An investigation carried out The Observer newspaper, in 2009, revealed the possible that cause of contamination of soil and ground water in Malwa region of Punjab, to be the fly ash from coal burnt at thermal power plants, which contains high levels of uranium and ash as the region has state's two biggest coal-fired power stations.

Tests on ground water carried out by Dr Chander Parkash, a wetland ecologist and Dr Surinder Singh, also at Guru Nanak Dev University, Amritsar, found the highest average concentration of uranium 56.95 µg/L, in the town of Bhucho Mandi in Bathinda district, a short distance from the ash pond of Lehra Mohabat thermal power plant. At village Jai Singh Wala, close to the Batinda ash pond, similar test results showed an average level of 52.79 µg/L.

In the last years, more and more researchers came to the conclusion that geological causes are the main source of the uranium contamination in Punjab, as it is long known that in the underlying Siwalik sediments uranium enrichments occur (Phadke et al. 1985, Singh et al. 2009, Patnaik et al. 2015, Raju et al. 2015).

Response 

News of these findings sparked a controversy in the media, as the Government of Punjab in April 2009, ordered a probe into the matter, and a series of tests with the Bhabha Atomic Research Centre, Trombay were conducted.  It was later stated, "..there is no side  of uranium and they have studied in the hair parts and the levels are very much below the levels. So that can't cause any mental retardation or any abnormality, " ...The government attributed the abnormalities to genetic disorders. The local media, however blamed the government for the absence of proper norms to monitor the environmental impact of ash ponds, and lack of proper study of the prevalent uranium contamination in the region.

Other forms of toxicity

In 2009, under a Greenpeace Research Laboratories investigation, Dr Reyes Tirado, from the University of Exeter, UK,  conducted a study in 50 villages in Muktsar, Bathinda and Ludhiana districts, revealed chemical, radiation and biological toxicity rampant in Punjab.  20% of the sampled wells showed nitrate levels above the safety limit of 50 mg/L, established by WHO, the study connected it with high use of synthetic nitrogen fertilizers.

With increasing poisoning of the soil, the region once hailed as the home to the Green revolution, now due to excessive use of chemical fertilizer, is being termed the "Other Bhopal", and "even credit-takers of the Revolution have begun to admit they had been wrong, now that they see wastelands and lives lost to farmer suicides in this 'granary of India'".

References

External links
 Baba Farid Center For Special Children (BFCSC), website
 
 A.V. Phadke, T.M. Mahadevan, G.R. Narayandas and A.C. Saraswat: Uranium Mineralisation in Some Phanerozoic Sandstones of India, in: Geological Environments of Sandstone-Type Uranium Deposits. International Atomic Energy Agency, Vienna, 1985
 H. Singh, J. Singh, S. Singh and B.S. Bajwa: Uranium concentration in drinking water samples using the SSNTDs. Indian J. Phys. 83: 1039-1044, 2009
 A. Srivastava, F. Knolle, F. Hoyler, U.W. Scherer and E. Schnug: Uranium Toxicity in the State of Punjab in North-Western India. – In: N.J. Raju, W. Gossel and M. Sudhakar (Eds.): Management of Natural Resources in a Changing Environment, Jointly published with Capital Publishing Company, New Delhi, India, 2015
 R. Patnaik, S. Lahiri, V. Chahar, N. Naskar, P.K. Sharma, D.K. Avhad, M.K.T. Bassan, F. Knolle, E. Schnug and A. Srivastava: Study of uranium mobilization from Himalayan Siwaliks to the Malwa region of Punjab state in India. - J. Radioanal. Nucl. Chem. 308:913-918, 2016

Environmental issues in India
Faridkot district
2000s in Punjab, India
Medical controversies in India
Environmental controversies
Bathinda district
Uranium politics
2009 disasters in India
Disasters in Punjab, India